Brunet Zamora Fernandez (born October 25, 1974 in Havana) is a Cuban born, Italian boxer. The resident of Trieste, Italy is competing in the Light Welterweight (– 64 kg) division, and won the bronze medal at the 2002 European Amateur Boxing Championships.

Professional record 

|-
| style="text-align:center;" colspan="8"|24 Wins (10 knockouts, 14 decisions), 1 losses, 2 Draws
|-  style="text-align:center; background:#e3e3e3;"
|  style="border-style:none none solid solid; "|Res.
|  style="border-style:none none solid solid; "|Record
|  style="border-style:none none solid solid; "|Opponent
|  style="border-style:none none solid solid; "|Type
|  style="border-style:none none solid solid; "|Rd., Time
|  style="border-style:none none solid solid; "|Date
|  style="border-style:none none solid solid; "|Location
|  style="border-style:none none solid solid; "|Notes
|- align=center
|Win
|24–1-2
|align=left| Krzysztof Szot
|
|
|
|align=left|
|align=left|
|-align=center
|Win
|23–1-2
|align=left| Michael Isaac Carrero
|
|
|
|align=left|
|align=left|
|-align=center
|Lost
|22–1-2
|align=left| Denis Shafikov
|
|
|
|align=left|
|align=left|
|-align=center
|Win
|22–0-2
|align=left| Santos Medrano
|
|
|
|align=left|
|align=left|
|-align=center
|Draw
|21–0-2
|align=left| Alberto Mosquera
|
|
|
|align=left|
|align=left|
|-align=center
|Win
|21–0-1
|align=left| Martin Antonio Coggi
|
|
|
|align=left|
|align=left|
|-align=center
|Draw
|20–0-1
|align=left| Denis Shafikov
|
|
|
|align=left|
|align=left|
|-align=center
|Win
|20–0
|align=left| Eduardo Daniel Roman
|
|
|
|align=left|
|align=left|
|-align=center
|Win
|19–0
|align=left| Christophe De Busillet
|
|
|
|align=left|
|align=left|
|-align=center
|Win
|18-0
|align=left| Laszlo Komjathi
|
|
|
|align=left|
|align=left|
|-align=center
|Win
|17–0
|align=left| Peter Semo
|
|
|
|align=left|
|align=left|
|-align=center
|Win
|16–0
|align=left| Sidney Siqueira
|
|
|
|align=left|
|align=left|
|-align=center
|Win
|15–0
|align=left| Andrzej Sark
|
|
|
|align=left|
|align=left|
|-align=center
|Win
|14–0
|align=left| Emanuele De Prophetis
|
|
|
|align=left|
|align=left|
|-align=center
|Win
|13–0
|align=left| Alfredo Di Feto
|
|
|
|align=left|
|align=left|
|-align=center
|Win
|12–0
|align=left| Laszlo Bognar
|
|
|
|align=left|
|align=left|
|-align=center
|Win
|11–0
|align=left| Massimo Bertozzi
|
|
|
|align=left|
|align=left|
|-align=center
|Win
|10–0
|align=left| Michal Durovic
|
|
|
|align=left|
|align=left|
|-align=center
|Win
|9–0
|align=left| Albert Starikov
|
|
|
|align=left|
|align=left|
|-align=center
|Win
|8–0
|align=left| Andreas Reimer
|
|
|
|align=left|
|align=left|
|-align=center
|Win
|7–0
|align=left| Viktor Baranov
|
|
|
|align=left|
|align=left|
|-align=center
|Win
|6–0
|align=left| Mircea Lurci
|
|
|
|align=left|
|align=left|
|-align=center
|Win
|5–0
|align=left| Peter McDonagh
|
|
|
|align=left|
|align=left|
|-align=center
|Win
|4–0
|align=left| Albert Starikov
|
|
|
|align=left|
|align=left|
|-align=center
|Win
|3–0
|align=left| Vadzim Astapuk
|
|
|
|align=left|
|align=left|
|-align=center
|Win
|2–0
|align=left| Claudiu Pop
|
|
|
|align=left|
|align=left|
|-align=center
|Win
|1–0
|align=left| Pavel Nemecek
|
|
|
|align=left|
|align=left|

References

External links
 

1974 births
Living people
Cuban male boxers
Cuban emigrants to Italy
Light-welterweight boxers
Boxers from Havana
Italian male boxers